Muriel Kathleen Bateman married name Muriel Flaxman (1883-1961) was an Indian born English international badminton player.

Badminton career
Muriel was a winner of the All England Open Badminton Championships. She won the women's 1910 All England Badminton Championships and 1913 All England Badminton Championships doubles.

Additionally she won the Irish Open in 1907, 1909 and 1910, and the French Open in 1910, 1911, 1912 and 1914.

References

English female badminton players
1883 births
1961 deaths
British people in colonial India